Events from the year 1825 in Germany

Incumbents

Kingdoms 
 Kingdom of Prussia
 Monarch – Frederick William III of Prussia (16 November 1797 – 7 June 1840)
 Kingdom of Bavaria
 Maximilian I (1 January 1806 – 13 October 1825)
 Ludwig I (13 October 1825 – 20 March 1848)
 Kingdom of Saxony
 Frederick Augustus I (20 December 1806 – 5 May 1827)
 Kingdom of Hanover
 George IV  (29 January 1820 – 26 June 1830)
 Kingdom of Württemberg
 William (30 October 1816 – 25 June 1864)

Grand Duchies 
 Grand Duke of Baden
 Louis I (8 December 1818 – 30 March 1830)
 Grand Duke of Hesse
 Louis I (14 August 1806 – 6 April 1830)
 Grand Duke of Mecklenburg-Schwerin
 Frederick Francis I– (24 April 1785 – 1 February 1837)
 Grand Duke of Mecklenburg-Strelitz
 George (6 November 1816 – 6 September 1860)
 Grand Duke of Oldenburg
 Peter I (2 July 1823 - 21 May 1829)
 Grand Duke of Saxe-Weimar-Eisenach
 Charles Frederick (14 June 1828 - 8 July 1853)

Principalities 
 Schaumburg-Lippe
 George William (13 February 1787 - 1860)
 Schwarzburg-Rudolstadt
 Friedrich Günther (28 April 1807 - 28 June 1867)
 Schwarzburg-Sondershausen
 Günther Friedrich Karl I (14 October 1794 - 19 August 1835)
 Principality of Lippe
 Leopold II (5 November 1802 - 1 January 1851)
 Principality of Reuss-Greiz
 Heinrich XIX (29 January 1817 - 31 October 1836)
 Waldeck and Pyrmont
 George II (9 September 1813 - 15 May 1845)

Duchies 
 Duke of Anhalt-Dessau
 Leopold IV (9 August 1817 - 22 May 1871)
 Duke of Brunswick
 Charles II (16 June 1815 – 9 September 1830)
 Duke of Saxe-Altenburg
 Duke of Saxe-Hildburghausen (1780–1826) and Duke of Saxe-Altenburg (1826–1834) - Frederick
 Duke of Saxe-Coburg and Gotha
 Ernest I (9 December 1806 – 12 November 1826)
 Duke of Saxe-Meiningen
 Bernhard II (24 December 1803–20 September 1866)
Duke of Schleswig-Holstein-Sonderburg-Glücksburg
Frederick William (6 July 1825 – 17 February 1831)

Events 
 February –  February flood of 1825
 6 July – The Duke of Schleswig-Holstein-Sonderburg-Beck gains possession of Glücksburg and changes his title to Friedrich Wilhelm, Duke of Schleswig-Holstein-Sonderburg-Glücksburg. The line of Schleswig-Holstein-Sonderburg-Glücksburg later becomes the royal house of Greece, Denmark and Norway.

Births 
14 July – Adolf Cluss, German-born architect in Washington, D.C. (died 1905)

Deaths 
 23 April – Maler Müller, German poet, dramatist and painter (born 1749)
 13 June – Johann Peter Melchior, German porcelain modeller (born 1742)
 12 July – Dorothea von Rodde-Schlözer, German scholar (b. 1770)
 13 October – King Maximilian I Joseph of Bavaria (b. 1756)
 14 November – Jean Paul, German writer (b. 1763)
 17 November – Daniel Berger, German engraver (born 1744)

References

Years of the 19th century in Germany
Germany
Germany
1825 in Germany